Buddy Henderson (né Harry Fisher Henderson; October 20, 1943 – March 9, 2012), better known as "Bugs" Henderson, was an American blues guitarist. He was popular in Europe and from the 1970s, was based in Dallas–Fort Worth, Texas, where he was known as a local blues guitar legend. 

Henderson was born in Palm Springs, California and spent his early life in Tyler, Texas, where he formed a band called the Sensores at age 16, and later joined Mouse and the Traps. In Dallas–Fort Worth during the early 1970s, he was lead guitarist for the blues/rock band Nitzinger before forming the Shuffle Kings and later a band that was eponymously named. Henderson played with blues musicians such as B. B. King, Eric Clapton, Muddy Waters, and Stevie Ray Vaughan, as well as with rhythm and blues saxophonist Don Wise and rock guitarist Ted Nugent. 

Henderson died just four days after a benefit concert in his name from complications of liver cancer, aged 68, in March 2012. The performers at the 11-hour "Benefit Bugs" event included Ray Wylie Hubbard, Smokin' Joe Kubek & Bnois King, and Mouse and the Traps, the band from early in his career with the hit songs, "A Public Execution" and "Maid of Sugar – Maid of Spice" that featured his guitar solos.

Discography
with Nitzinger
1972 – One Foot in History

as The Bugs Henderson Group
1978 – At Last-Live
1981 – Still Flyin1989 – Backbop

as Bugs Henderson1982 – Back Bop! The Unreleased '82 Sessions
1993 – Years in the Jungle
1995 – Daredevils of the Red Guitar

with The Stratoblasters1986 – Texan Eagles

as Bugs Henderson & The Shuffle Kings1992 – Gitarbazndrumz (Live)
1993 – American Music
1995 – That's the Truth (Live)
1996 – Four Tens Strike Again
1997 – Henderson & Jones (Live)
1998 – Have Blues...Must Rock
2000 – Call of the Wild (Live at the Meisenfrei)
2001 – Adventures of the Shuffle Kings
2003 – We're a Texas Band – Live in Germany
2004 – Stormy Love
2008 – Blue Music
2009 - Vienna Calling

with R. Buchanan, F. King, T. Nugent, J. Winter'''
1997 – Legendary Jams 1976–1980	
Compilations
1998 – Heartbroke Again, Blue Flame, BFBL001
2006 – Electric Snow "The Best Of"''

References

1943 births
2012 deaths
American blues guitarists
American male guitarists
Musicians from Palm Springs, California
People from Marion County, Texas
Guitarists from California
Deaths from liver cancer
Deaths from cancer in Texas
20th-century American guitarists
People from Tyler, Texas
20th-century American male musicians